Alfred A. DelliBovi (born February 1, 1946) is an American banker and political figure who was President of the Federal Home Loan Bank of New York from 1992 until 2014.

Biography
DelliBovi was born in New York City and grew up in Astoria, Queens. He graduated from Fordham College (B.A., 1967) and Baruch College (M.P.A., 1973). He initially worked as a high school English and social studies teacher. He was director of the public relations unit for the State Assembly from 1969 to 1971 before being elected to it.

DelliBovi was a member of the New York State Assembly from 1971 to 1978, sitting in the 179th, 180th, 181st and 182nd New York State Legislatures. There he specialized in banking issues. He was the Republican nominee for election to the U.S. House of Representatives from New York's 9th Congressional District in 1978, but lost to Democrat Geraldine Ferraro.

He was Regional Administrator in New York from 1981 to 1984, Deputy Administrator from 1984 to 1987, and Administrator of the Urban Mass Transportation Administration at the U.S. Department of Transportation in Washington, D.C. from 1987 to 1989, having been appointed by President Ronald Reagan.

He was United States Deputy Secretary of Housing and Urban Development from 1989 until 1992 under Jack Kemp, having been appointed by President George H. W. Bush.

In November 1992, DelliBovi became president and CEO of the Federal Home Loan Bank of New York. He remained in the position for 21 years, until retiring on March 31, 2014.

References

External links

1946 births
Living people
United States Deputy Secretaries of Housing and Urban Development
United States Department of Transportation officials
People from Queens, New York
Republican Party members of the New York State Assembly
American bankers
20th-century American politicians